Minywa is a village in the Monywa District in central Myanmar.

References 

Populated places in Sagaing District
Villages in Myanmar